Environmental engineers conduct hazardous-waste management studies to evaluate the significance of such hazards, advise on treatment and containment, and develop regulations to prevent mishaps. Environmental engineers also design municipal water supply and industrial wastewater treatment systems as well as address local and worldwide environmental issues such as the effects of acid rain, global warming, ozone depletion, water pollution and air pollution from automobile exhausts and industrial sources.

List of notable environmental engineers

 G. D. Agrawal
 Braden Allenby
 Abel Wolman
 Andrew Charles, originally a marine engineer, works with SembCorp
 Ashraf Choudhary
 Marc Edwards, civil engineering professor
 Isabel Escobar
 Robert A. Gearheart
 Alfred Stowell Jones
 Sudhakar Kesavan
 Joseph Lstiburek
 Daniel Oerther
 George Pinder
 Ellen Swallow Richards, known as the first female environmental engineer
 Paul V. Roberts
 George Stroumpoulis
 Daniel A. Vallero

References

 
Environmental engineers
Environmental engineers
.